NGC 4536 is an intermediate spiral galaxy in the constellation Virgo located about 10° south of the midpoint of the Virgo cluster. However, it is not considered a member of the cluster. Rather, it is a member of the M61 Group of galaxies, which is a member of the Virgo II Groups, a series of galaxies and galaxy clusters strung out from the southern edge of the Virgo Supercluster. The morphological classification in the De Vaucouleurs system is SAB(rs)bc, which indicates it is a weakly barred spiral galaxy with a hint of an inner ring structure plus moderate to loosely wound arms. It does not have a classical bulge around the nucleus.

NGC 4536 has the optical characteristics of an HII galaxy, which means it is undergoing a strong burst of star formation. This is occurring prominently in the ring that surrounds the bar and nucleus. Based upon the level of X-ray emission from the core, it may have a small supermassive black hole with 104–106 times the mass of the Sun.

On March 8, 1981, a type Ia supernova was discovered 51 arcseconds to the northeast of the galactic center. Designated SN 1981b, it reached a peak visual magnitude of 12 on March 8 before steadily fading from view over the next two months. No prior supernova events have been observed in this galaxy.

Gallery

See also
 NGC 6946 - a similar spiral galaxy
 NGC 1365 - A similar-looking galaxy

References

External links

Intermediate spiral galaxies
Virgo (constellation)
4536
07732
41823